My Darling Clementine is an English country music duo who formed in 2010 in Birmingham, England.

History 
The band was formed by Birmingham-based couple Michael Weston King and Lou Dalgleish, musicians in their own rights for many years and who began to perform together as My Darling Clementine in 2010, after 10 years of marriage.

Prior to My Darling Clementine, Lou Dalgleish worked with Bryan Ferry, Steven Spielberg and The Brodsky Quartet. From 1993 to 2000 she released 4 albums (including the acclaimed Live at Ronnie Scotts). In 2001 Dalgleish wrote and appeared in the play "They Call Her Natasha", a story of obsession and infatuation, based around a series of Elvis Costello songs, which was first performed at the Edinburgh Festival.

Michael Weston King is the former leader of The Good Sons, who Mojo magazine dubbed as 'England's very own Uncle Tupelo.' King has released 10 solo albums and 4 more albums with The Good Sons and has also made collaborations with Chris Hillman, Ron Sexsmith, Jackie Leven and Townes Van Zandt (who cut his own version of King's song "Riding The Range").

The instrumental touring band of My Darling Clementine has gathered together renowned British rock, country and blues musicians as guitarist Martin Belmont (Graham Parker & The Rumour, Nick Lowe, Elvis Costello, Ducks Deluxe), keyboardist Liam Grundy (Scotty Moore, James Burton), Bassist Kevin Foster (Jackie Leven, Ducks Deluxe, Los Pistoleros, Doll by Doll), drummer Neil Bullock (Chuck Berry, Ronnie Scott, Broadcast) and Pedal Steel guitarist Alan Cook (Chris Hillman, The Charlatans, Jackie Leven).

They released their first single "100,000 Words" in 2012.

In 2012, My Darling Clementine released their first album, "How do you plead?" The album received good reviews by the BBC, Guardian and went on earn them 2012 Americana Music Artist of the year at the British Country Music Awards

My Darling Clementine released their 2nd album, "The Reconciliation?" in late 2013. The album was recorded at the Sheffield studio, Yellow Arch and produced by Colin Elliot, (Richard Hawley, Duane Eddy, Jarvis Cocker) and features special guest appearances from Kinky Friedman, The Brodsky Quartet & The Richard Hawley band.

In 2014 Michael Weston King and Lou Dalgleish performed a series of UK shows with crime writer Mark Billingham, billed as The Other Half after Billingham wrote his story "The Other Half" so named after one of the duo's songs.

An album of the same name was released in 2015, released by the publisher Little Brown / Hachette. It featured Guest appearances from actor David Morrissey, singer and songwriter Graham Parker, and The Brodsky Quartet. It was featured on BBC Radio 4.

In 2017 they released the soul and gospel influenced album Still Testifying   Re-uniting with producer Neil Brockbank and the majority of musicians who appeared on the band's debut album including Martin Belmont, Geraint Watkins, Bob Loveday and newly added horn players Matt Holland, Nick Pentelow and Andy Wood.  It was recorded at Gold Top / Gravity Shack in Tooting, South London.

Musical style

My Darling Clementine are influenced by the great American country duos from the 1960s and 1970s like Tammy Wynette and George Jones, or Johnny Cash and June Carter.

Members
Singers
Michael Weston King – vocals, guitar
Lou Dalgleish – vocals
Instrumental band
Martin Belmont – guitar
Liam Grundy – piano, organ
Kevin Foster – bass
Neil Bullock – drums
Alan Cook – pedal steel guitar

Discography
 How Do You Plead? 2011
 The Reconciliation? 2013
 The Lucky Bag 2014 (Record Store Day – 10" vinyl EP)
 The Other Half 2015 (with Mark Billingham)
 The Riverbend 2016 (Record Store Day – 10" EP)
 Still Testifying 2017
 Country Darkness 2020 (collecting together Country Darkness Vol 1-3 EPs)

References

External links
 Official Site

English country music groups
English musical duos
Country music duos
Musical groups from Birmingham, West Midlands
Americana music groups
Americana in the United Kingdom